WebScarab is a web security application testing tool.  It serves as a proxy that intercepts and allows people to alter web browser web requests (both HTTP and HTTPS) and web server replies.  WebScarab also may record traffic for further review.

WebScarab is an open source tool developed by The Open Web Application Security Project (OWASP), and was implemented in Java so it could run across multiple operating systems.  In 2013 official development of WebScarab slowed, and it appears that  OWASP's Zed Attack Proxy ("ZAP") Project (another Java-based, open source proxy tool but with more features and active development) is WebScarab's official successor, although ZAP itself was forked from the Paros Proxy, not WebScarab.

References

External links 
 Current version
 Next version (functional, but still in development)
 Easy Website Builder

Web development
Software testing tools
Computer network security